Saruq (also Romanized as Sārūq; also known as Sāroq) is a village in Bashtin Rural District, Bashtin District, Davarzan County, Razavi Khorasan Province, Iran. At the 2006 census, its population was 119, in 53 families.

References 

Populated places in Davarzan County